The arrondissement of Dijon is an arrondissement of France in the Côte-d'Or department in the Bourgogne-Franche-Comté region. It has 224 communes.

Composition

The communes of the arrondissement of Dijon, and their INSEE codes, are:

 Agey (21002)
 Ahuy (21003)
 Aiserey (21005)
 Ancey (21013)
 Arceau (21016)
 Arcey (21018)
 Arc-sur-Tille (21021)
 Asnières-lès-Dijon (21027)
 Athée (21028)
 Aubigny-lès-Sombernon (21033)
 Auxonne (21038)
 Avelanges (21039)
 Avot (21041)
 Barbirey-sur-Ouche (21045)
 Barjon (21049)
 Baulme-la-Roche (21051)
 Beaumont-sur-Vingeanne (21053)
 Beire-le-Châtel (21056)
 Beire-le-Fort (21057)
 Bellefond (21059)
 Belleneuve (21060)
 Bessey-lès-Cîteaux (21067)
 Bèze (21071)
 Bézouotte (21072)
 Billey (21074)
 Binges (21076)
 Blagny-sur-Vingeanne (21079)
 Blaisy-Bas (21080)
 Blaisy-Haut (21081)
 Bligny-le-Sec (21085)
 Bourberain (21094)
 Boussenois (21096)
 Bressey-sur-Tille (21105)
 Bretenière (21106)
 Bretigny (21107)
 Brognon (21111)
 Busserotte-et-Montenaille (21118)
 Bussières (21119)
 Bussy-la-Pesle (21121)
 Cessey-sur-Tille (21126)
 Chaignay (21127)
 Chambeire (21130)
 Champagne-sur-Vingeanne (21135)
 Champagny (21136)
 Champdôtre (21138)
 Chanceaux (21142)
 Charmes (21146)
 Chaume-et-Courchamp (21158)
 Chazeuil (21163)
 Chenôve (21166)
 Cheuge (21167)
 Chevigny-Saint-Sauveur (21171)
 Cirey-lès-Pontailler (21175)
 Clénay (21179)
 Cléry (21180)
 Collonges-et-Premières (21183)
 Corcelles-les-Monts (21192)
 Courlon (21207)
 Courtivron (21208)
 Couternon (21209)
 Crécey-sur-Tille (21211)
 Cuiserey (21215)
 Curtil-Saint-Seine (21218)
 Cussey-les-Forges (21220)
 Daix (21223)
 Dampierre-et-Flée (21225)
 Darois (21227)
 Diénay (21230)
 Dijon (21231)
 Drambon (21233)
 Drée (21234)
 Échannay (21238)
 Échevannes (21240)
 Échigey (21242)
 Épagny (21245)
 Étaules (21255)
 Étevaux (21256)
 Fauverney (21261)
 Fénay (21263)
 Flacey (21266)
 Flagey-lès-Auxonne (21268)
 Flammerans (21269)
 Flavignerot (21270)
 Fleurey-sur-Ouche (21273)
 Foncegrive (21275)
 Fontaine-Française (21277)
 Fontaine-lès-Dijon (21278)
 Fontenelle (21281)
 Fraignot-et-Vesvrotte (21283)
 Francheville (21284)
 Frénois (21286)
 Gemeaux (21290)
 Genlis (21292)
 Gergueil (21293)
 Gissey-sur-Ouche (21300)
 Grancey-le-Château-Neuvelle (21304)
 Grenant-lès-Sombernon (21306)
 Grosbois-en-Montagne (21310)
 Hauteville-lès-Dijon (21315)
 Heuilley-sur-Saône (21316)
 Is-sur-Tille (21317)
 Izeure (21319)
 Izier (21320)
 Jancigny (21323)
 Labergement-Foigney (21330)
 Labergement-lès-Auxonne (21331)
 Lamarche-sur-Saône (21337)
 Lamargelle (21338)
 Lantenay (21339)
 Léry (21345)
 Licey-sur-Vingeanne (21348)
 Longchamp (21351)
 Longeault-Pluvault (21352)
 Longecourt-en-Plaine (21353)
 Longvic (21355)
 Lux (21361)
 Magny-Montarlot (21367)
 Magny-Saint-Médard (21369)
 Magny-sur-Tille (21370)
 Les Maillys (21371)
 Mâlain (21373)
 Marandeuil (21376)
 Marcilly-sur-Tille (21383)
 Marey-sur-Tille (21385)
 Marliens (21388)
 Marsannay-la-Côte (21390)
 Marsannay-le-Bois (21391)
 Maxilly-sur-Saône (21398)
 Le Meix (21400)
 Mesmont (21406)
 Messigny-et-Vantoux (21408)
 Mirebeau-sur-Bèze (21416)
 Moloy (21421)
 Montigny-Mornay-Villeneuve-sur-Vingeanne (21433)
 Montmançon (21437)
 Montoillot (21439)
 Neuilly-Crimolois (21452)
 Noiron-sur-Bèze (21459)
 Norges-la-Ville (21462)
 Oisilly (21467)
 Orain (21468)
 Orgeux (21469)
 Orville (21472)
 Ouges (21473)
 Panges (21477)
 Pasques (21478)
 Pellerey (21479)
 Perrigny-lès-Dijon (21481)
 Perrigny-sur-l'Ognon (21482)
 Pichanges (21483)
 Plombières-lès-Dijon (21485)
 Pluvet (21487)
 Poiseul-la-Grange (21489)
 Poiseul-lès-Saulx (21491)
 Poncey-lès-Athée (21493)
 Poncey-sur-l'Ignon (21494)
 Pont (21495)
 Pontailler-sur-Saône (21496)
 Pouilly-sur-Vingeanne (21503)
 Prâlon (21504)
 Prenois (21508)
 Quetigny (21515)
 Remilly-en-Montagne (21520)
 Remilly-sur-Tille (21521)
 Renève (21522)
 Rouvres-en-Plaine (21532)
 Ruffey-lès-Echirey (21535)
 Sacquenay (21536)
 Saint-Anthot (21539)
 Saint-Apollinaire (21540)
 Sainte-Marie-sur-Ouche (21559)
 Saint-Jean-de-Bœuf (21553)
 Saint-Julien (21555)
 Saint-Léger-Triey (21556)
 Saint-Martin-du-Mont (21561)
 Saint-Maurice-sur-Vingeanne (21562)
 Saint-Sauveur (21571)
 Saint-Seine-l'Abbaye (21573)
 Saint-Seine-sur-Vingeanne (21574)
 Saint-Victor-sur-Ouche (21578)
 Salives (21579)
 Saulx-le-Duc (21587)
 Saussy (21589)
 Savigny-le-Sec (21591)
 Savigny-sous-Mâlain (21592)
 Savolles (21595)
 Selongey (21599)
 Sennecey-lès-Dijon (21605)
 Soirans (21609)
 Soissons-sur-Nacey (21610)
 Sombernon (21611)
 Spoy (21614)
 Talant (21617)
 Talmay (21618)
 Tanay (21619)
 Tarsul (21620)
 Tart (21623)
 Tart-le-Bas (21622)
 Tellecey (21624)
 Thorey-en-Plaine (21632)
 Til-Châtel (21638)
 Tillenay (21639)
 Tréclun (21643)
 Trochères (21644)
 Trouhaut (21646)
 Turcey (21648)
 Val-Suzon (21651)
 Varanges (21656)
 Varois-et-Chaignot (21657)
 Vaux-Saules (21659)
 Velars-sur-Ouche (21661)
 Vernois-lès-Vesvres (21665)
 Vernot (21666)
 Véronnes (21667)
 Verrey-sous-Drée (21669)
 Vieilmoulin (21679)
 Vielverge (21680)
 Viévigne (21682)
 Villecomte (21692)
 Villers-les-Pots (21699)
 Villers-Rotin (21701)
 Villey-sur-Tille (21702)
 Villotte-Saint-Seine (21705)
 Vonges (21713)

History

The arrondissement of Dijon was created in 1800. At the January 2017 reorganisation of the arrondissements of Côte-d'Or, it lost 31 communes to the arrondissement of Beaune.

As a result of the reorganisation of the cantons of France which came into effect in 2015, the borders of the cantons are no longer related to the borders of the arrondissements. The cantons of the arrondissement of Dijon were, as of January 2015:

 Auxonne
 Chenôve
 Dijon-1
 Dijon-2
 Dijon-3
 Dijon-4
 Dijon-5
 Dijon-6
 Dijon-7
 Dijon-8
 Fontaine-Française
 Fontaine-lès-Dijon
 Genlis
 Gevrey-Chambertin
 Grancey-le-Château-Neuvelle
 Is-sur-Tille
 Mirebeau-sur-Bèze
 Pontailler-sur-Saône
 Saint-Seine-l'Abbaye
 Selongey
 Sombernon

References

Dijon
Dijon